Silvia Croatto  (born ) is a retired Italian female volleyball player. She was part of the Italy women's national volleyball team winning the silver medal at the 2001 Women's European Volleyball Championship.

She participated in the 1994 FIVB Volleyball Women's World Championship.
She also played at the 2003 Women's European Volleyball Championship. On club level she played with Teodora Ravenna.

Clubs
 Teodora Ravenna (1994)

References

1973 births
Living people
Italian women's volleyball players
Place of birth missing (living people)